Jacqueline McCord Leo is an American magazine editor and media producer.

Career
Jacqueline Leo is founder and former Editor-in-Chief of The Fiscal Times, a news website she launched in February 2010.

After spending her early years in the magazine and newspaper business, Leo founded and launched Child (magazine) in 1986. A year later, The New York Times Magazine Group acquired the magazine and appointed her Editor-in-Chief of Family Circle magazine. Under her leadership, an article on toxic waste dumping won the 1990 National Magazine Award for Public Interest, the first time that a woman's magazine ever received the honor. She later became Editorial Director of The New York Times Women's Magazine Group, where she launched Fitness magazine and a variety of special interest publications.

Since then, Leo worked in a variety of media: She was Vice President of Editorial Operations, Sales and Marketing for Meredith Interactive where she oversaw the digital development of Better Homes and Gardens (magazine) and Ladies' Home Journal; she was Senior Producer and Editorial Director for ABC News’ Good Morning America; and she served as Editorial Director for Consumer Reports magazine and their varied media products.

From 2001 through November 2007, Leo was vice president and Editor-in-Chief of Reader's Digest, the largest paid circulation magazine in the U.S., with a readership of 38 million. She was responsible for converting the magazine from reprints to original content and introducing contemporary graphics, columns and features in the magazine. Leo produced a half-hour documentary about the life of Alex Haley, a former contributor to Reader's Digest, as a companion to the book, Alex Haley: The Man Who Traced America's Roots.

Leo's latest book, Seven: The Number for Happiness, Love, and Success was published in December 2009, by Jonathan Karp, then editor and publisher of 12 Books, a Hachette company.

Awards and honors
Leo has won a number of awards, and has served in leadership positions with media organizations. She is a former president of the American Society of Magazine Editors and winner of the 1991 National Magazine Award in Public Interest. She was also a three-time NMA nominee. Leo received the Breakthrough Award and the Matrix Award, the latter from New York Women in Communications, an organization for which she also served as president. Leo was an active member of the Board of Governors of the New York Academy of Sciences for ten years. She is listed in Who's Who in America. Most recently, she was named to Media Industry Newsletter's Editorial Hall of Fame in November, 2009.

Personal life
Jacqueline Leo was married to columnist and author John Leo. Her daughter, Alex Leo, is the head of audience at The News Project. Leo was born in Bay Ridge, Brooklyn, and attended Baruch College of the City University of New York. In 2018, she completed an executive program at MIT Sloan School of Management on Artificial Intelligence.

References

External links
Media Week Article
Jackie Leo at TED conference
"The media's impact on the future," Gulf News
"Reader's Digest Seeks to Bring Americans Together with America 2.0: The Upgrade," mediaVillage
"Jacqueline Leo Named Editor-in-Chief of Reader's Digest," PRNewswire
Seven: The Number for Happiness, Love, and Success

Living people
American magazine editors
American magazine founders
American women journalists
Baruch College alumni
People from Bay Ridge, Brooklyn
American women company founders
American company founders
Journalists from New York City
Women magazine editors
Year of birth missing (living people)
21st-century American women
Presidents of the American Society of Magazine Editors